Poplars, Populus species, are used as food plants by the larvae of a large number of Lepidoptera species:

Monophagous
Species which feed exclusively on Populus

 Bucculatricidae
 Bucculatrix staintonella
 Gelechiidae
 Chionodes terminimaculella
 Drepanidae
 Tethea ocularis (figure of eighty)

Polyphagous
Species which feed on Populus and other plants

 Batrachedridae
 Batrachedra praeangusta – recorded on white poplar (P. alba) and common aspen (P. tremula)
 Coleophoridae
 Coleophora malivorella
 Coleophora pruniella
 Geometridae
 Agriopis marginaria (dotted border)
 Cabera exanthemata (common wave) – recorded on aspens
 Cabera pusaria (common white wave) – recorded on aspens
 Colotois pennaria (feathered thorn) – recorded on black poplar (P. nigra)
 Crocallis elinguaria (scalloped oak) – recorded on aspens
 Ectropis crepuscularia (engrailed)
 Epirrita autumnata (autumnal moth)
 Eupithecia subfuscata (grey pug)
 Lomaspilis marginata (clouded border)
 Odontopera bidentata (scalloped hazel)
 Operophtera brumata (winter moth)
 Selenia tetralunaria (purple thorn) – recorded on black poplar (P. nigra)
 Hepialidae
 Korscheltellus gracilis (conifer swift)
 Sthenopis purpurascens
 Lymantriidae
 Euproctis chrysorrhoea (brown-tail)
 Lymantria dispar (gypsy moth)
 Noctuidae
 Acronicta leporina (miller)
 Acronicta megacephala (poplar grey)
 Acronicta psi (grey dagger)
 Agrochola circellaris (brick)
 Amphipyra berbera (Svensson's copper underwing) – recorded on aspens
 Amphipyra tragopoginis (mouse moth)
 Catocala cara (darling underwing)
 Catocala junctura (joined underwing) – recorded on Fremont cottonwood (P. fremontii)
 Discestra trifolii (nutmeg)
 Orthosia cerasi (common Quaker)
 Orthosia gothica (Hebrew character)
 Notodontidae
 Furcula bifida (poplar kitten)
 Nadata gibbosa (rough prominent)
 Phalera bucephala (buff-tip)
 Ptilodon capucina (coxcomb prominent)
 Nymphalidae
 Limenitis archippus (viceroy butterfly)
 Limenitis arthemis (American white admiral/red-spotted purple) – prefers quaking aspen (P. tremuloides) over Ontario balsam poplar (P. balsamifera), eastern cottonwood (P. deltoides) and bigtooth aspen (P. grandidentata)
 Nymphalis antiopa (Camberwell beauty/mourning cloak)
 Oecophoridae
 Epicallima formosella – recorded in dead wood of poplars and aspens
 Papilionidae
 Papilio glaucus (eastern tiger swallowtail) – recorded on cottonwoods
 Papilio rutulus (western tiger swallowtail) – recorded on quaking aspen
 Saturniidae
 Coloradia pandora (Pandora pinemoth) – recorded on aspens
 Pavonia pavonia (emperor moth) – recorded on aspens
 Sphingidae
 Laothoe populi (poplar hawk-moth)
 Smerinthus jamaicensis (twin-spotted sphinx)

External links

Populus
+Lepidoptera